Jared Hennegan (born August 5, 1971), better known by the stage name "Evil" Jared Hasselhoff, is an American musician and television personality best known for being the former bassist of the rock band Bloodhound Gang.

Early life 

Hasselhoff was born Jared Hennegan in Philadelphia and raised in Woxall, Pennsylvania. He graduated from Souderton Area High School. He helped establish Woxfeat, a rock festival in his hometown.  He attended Temple University, where he met future Bloodhound Gang member Jimmy Pop. At various times, Hasselhoff has claimed to be the illegitimate son and tennis partner of Knight Rider actor David Hasselhoff, although none of these appear to be the case.

Career

Bloodhound Gang 

As a member of the musical group Bloodhound Gang, Hasselhoff is an Echo award winner and was twice honored with the prestigious Comet award.

Other projects 
In 2007, Hasselhoff played bass for the German crunk artist Tony Damager's song "Totalschaden". He also played bass in the video clip, along with Sido on drums and B-Tight on the guitar.

Hasselhoff participated in the Wok championship 2010 ("Wok-WM 2010") in Oberhof on March 19, 2010. He also participated in the Wok-WM 2011, 2012, 2013, 2014, 2015, and 2022.

Hasselhoff guest-starred as himself in two episodes of the German soap opera Verbotene Liebe, which aired in June 2008 on German television channel Das Erste.

On March 30, 2012, Hasselhoff defeated two-time Olympic discus medalist Lars Riedel via a fourth-round KO to become the German celeb-boxing heavyweight champion.

Hasselhoff currently has a recurring role as himself in the ProSieben game shows Duell um die Welt, Die beste Show der Welt and Joko & Klaas gegen Prosieben.

Hasselhoff is the host of the alternative science magazine Evil Science which airs on the German ProSieben Maxx network.

Personal life 
In 2006, Hasselhoff moved to Berlin, Germany, due to his resentment of George W. Bush's politics. He stated that he would not return to the United States as long as Bush was president.

Hasselhoff suffers from obsessive compulsive disorder, and has asked for his requested Skittles to be separated by color on at least one rider while on tour. According to his episode of MTV Cribs, he also suffers from irritable bowel syndrome.

In 2013, Ukraine banned Hasselhoff from entering the country for five years after he allegedly urinated on the Ukrainian flag at a concert in Kyiv. A few days later, the band was due to perform at Russia's Kubana Festival on the Black Sea coast, but the gig did not go ahead, due to another concert stunt in which he stuffed the Russian flag into his underpants. Instead, they were questioned by police and were ordered to leave Russia.

Filmography

References 

1971 births
Living people
American rock bass guitarists
American male bass guitarists
American expatriates in Germany
American rock musicians
Rap rock musicians
Temple University alumni
Guitarists from Philadelphia
American male guitarists
Bloodhound Gang members
21st-century American bass guitarists
People from Friedrichshain-Kreuzberg